Mănăstirea Cașin is a commune in Bacău County, Western Moldavia, Romania. It is composed of four villages: Lupești, Mănăstirea Cașin, Pârvulești, and Scutaru.

It is located at the southwestern extremity of the county, on the border with the Vrancea and Covasna counties. Mănăstirea Cașin is crossed by county road DJ115, which leads to the city of Onești,  to the north.

The , located in the Mănăstirea Cașin village, was founded in 1655 by Voivode Gheorghe Ștefan.

References

Communes in Bacău County
Localities in Western Moldavia